Orville may refer to:

People
 Orville (given name), a list of people with the male given name
 Howard Thomas Orville (1901–1960), American naval officer and meteorologist
 Max Orville (born 1962), French politician
 Merlyn Orville Valan (1926-2010), American politician and farmer
 Orville Redenbacher (1907-1995), American popcorn entrepreneur
 Orville Wright (1871-1948), American aviation pioneer

Places

France
 Orville, Côte-d'Or, a commune in the Côte-d'Or department
 Orville, Indre, a commune in the Indre department
 Orville, Loiret, a commune in the Loiret department
 Orville, Orne, a former commune in the Orne department
 Orville, Pas-de-Calais, a commune in the Pas-de-Calais department

United States
 Mount Orville, Alaska, a high peak of the Fairweather Range
 Orville, West Virginia, an unincorporated community

Elsewhere
 Orville Coast, a portion of the coast of Antarctica

Other uses
 Orville by Gibson, a brand of guitars
 The Orville, a science fiction television series
 Don Orville, a character in the American TV series 3rd Rock from the Sun
 Orville (horse), a British Thoroughbred racehorse and sire
 Orville the Duck, a puppet character featured by British ventriloquist Keith Harris

See also
 Oraville (disambiguation)
 Orval (disambiguation)
 Oroville (disambiguation)
 Orrville (disambiguation)
 Orvil (disambiguation)
 Orvillers-Sorel a commune in the Oise department in northern France